

112001–112100 

|-bgcolor=#f2f2f2
| colspan=4 align=center | 
|}

112101–112200 

|-bgcolor=#f2f2f2
| colspan=4 align=center | 
|}

112201–112300 

|-id=233
| 112233 Kammerer ||  || Andreas Kammerer (born 1958), German physicist and amateur astronomer, who has made photometric light-curve observations of comets || 
|}

112301–112400 

|-id=313
| 112313 Larrylines ||  || Larry Lines (1949–2019) was a Canadian exploration geophysicist. During his distinguished career he was a researcher at Amoco's Tulsa lab, a professor and industry consortium leader at Memorial University of Newfoundland and the University of Calgary, and president of the Society of Exploration Geophysicists. || 
|-id=320
| 112320 Danielegardiol ||  || Daniele Gardiol (born 1968) is an astronomer at the Torino Astrophysical Observatory (Italy). He is the principal investigator of the PRISMA project, a network of all-sky cameras dedicated to the observation of bright meteors in order to determine the trajectory and orbit of the progenitor bodies and to delimit the area where possible meteorites fall. || 
|-id=328
| 112328 Klinkerfues ||  || Wilhelm Klinkerfues (1827–1884), a German astronomer and meteorologist at Göttingen Observatory || 
|-id=337
| 112337 Francescaguerra ||  || Francesca Guerra (born 1984), an Italian mathematician and software developer for the Near-Earth Object Coordination Centre (NEOCC) of the European Space Agency. || 
|-id=338
| 112338 Seneseconte ||  || Senese Antonella (born 1960) and Conte Paolo (born 1961) are science communicators, working mainly in schools, explaining the sky with planetariums, telescopes and laboratories. Paolo is also editor and host of Radio3Scienza, the daily radio science broadcast of RAI, the national public broadcasting company of Italy. || 
|}

112401–112500 

|-id=483
| 112483 Missjudy || 2002 PA || Judy Ball (born 1946), wife of American amateur astronomer Loren C. Ball, who discovered this minor planet, for her long-time support of her husband's astronomy projects. || 
|-id=492
| 112492 Annacipriani ||  || Anna Cipriani (born 1973), an assistant professor of geochemistry and environmental geochemistry at University of Modena and Reggio Emilia. || 
|}

112501–112600 

|-id=527
| 112527 Panarese ||  || Rossella Panarese (1960–2021) was an Italian radio personality and science communicator, known for her Radio3 Scienza cultural programme, as well as a lecturer at SISSA and Sapienza University of Rome. || 
|}

112601–112700 

|-id=656
| 112656 Gines ||  || Gines Lopez (1933–2008), friend and collaborator of Spanish astronomer Rafael Ferrando, who discovered this minor planet || 
|}

112701–112800 

|-id=797
| 112797 Grantjudy ||  || Grant R. J. Harding  (born 1967) and Judy L. Harding (born 1965), siblings-in-law of Canadian amateur astronomer Andrew Lowe, who discovered this minor planet || 
|-id=798
| 112798 Kelindsey ||  || Kelsey Leanne Harding (born 2000) and Lindsey Annemarie Harding (born 1998), nieces of Canadian amateur astronomer Andrew Lowe, who discovered this minor planet || 
|}

112801–112900 

|-id=900
| 112900 Tonyhoffman ||  || Tony Hoffman (born 1958), an American poet, writer, editor, and director of the Amateur Astronomers Association of New York. He also discovered several sungrazing comets and is an uncredited co-discoverer of asteroid . || 
|}

112901–113000 

|-bgcolor=#f2f2f2
| colspan=4 align=center | 
|}

References 

112001-113000